Legenda, or the MKRC Legenda system, is a Soviet satellite targeting system mated to the SS-N-19 missile. It consisted of the US-P SIGINT satellites and the US-A Radar Ocean reconnaissance satellites, which were nuclear powered.
Legenda system consist of 37 ELINT satellite named US-P   and 32 US-A nuclear powered radar satellite  to provide global coverage 
Legenda is now non-functional after the US-A and US-P sats were deactivated. It is being replaced by the Liana system with 4 operational satellites as of July 2021.

See also
 P-700 Granit

References

Military equipment of the Soviet Union
Space program of the Soviet Union